The Quake-Catcher Network is an initiative run by the University of Southern California that aims to use computer-based accelerometers to detect earthquakes. It uses the BOINC volunteer computing platform (a form of distributed computing, similar to SETI@home).

It currently supports mobile devices (smartphones and some tablets/laptops) that have a built-in accelerometer.  It also supports three external USB devices currently - the codemercs.com JoyWarrior 24F8, the ONavi sensor, and the MotionNode Accel.

In 2011, project scientist Elizabeth Cochran was awarded a Presidential Early Career Award from US President Barack Obama in large part due to her founding of the Quake-Catcher Network project.

The Quake Catcher Network project started at Stanford University in 2008, then moved to Caltech, and joined the Southern California Earthquake Center (SCEC) and the Incorporated Research Institutions for Seismology (IRIS) in 2016.

References

External links 
 Interactive world map, showing recent earthquakes (day/week/month) – result of QCN

Science in society
Free science software
Volunteer computing projects